The Atlanta Figure Skating Club (AFSC) was founded in  and became a member club of US Figure Skating in 1958. It is the oldest figure skating club in Georgia and one of the largest figure skating clubs in the United States.

Annually the AFSC hosts the Magnolia Open and the Atlanta Open.

The AFSC hosted the 1976, 1985, 2000, and 2015 South Atlantic Regional Championships, the 1980 and 2004 National Championships, and the 2006 Eastern Sectional Championships.

In October 1992, the AFSC hosted Skate America International at the Omni arena.

Skaters who have represented the club
Alexander Aiken
Brittney McConn Bottoms
Allen Davis
Timothy Dolensky
Jackie Farrell
Brad Griffies
Todd Hansen
Kaysi Kitsell
Alice Qiao
Jabe Roberts
Leslie Sikes
Laura Steele
Colin Vander Veen
Valory Vennes
Debbie Walls
Elizabeth Wright-Johnson

Notable coaches and judges
Barbara Wagner, Olympic Gold Medalist and four-time Worlds' Champion in Pairs Skating coaches at The Cooler, the primary skating rink of the Atlanta figure skating club, as well as Herbert Wiesinger German Figure Skating Championships, three time Gold Medalist in German Figure Skating Championships.

References

External links
 

Figure skating clubs in the United States
1956 establishments in Georgia (U.S. state)
Sports clubs established in 1956